The K League All-Star Game is an annual association football exhibition match organised by the South Korean K League. The inaugural match was held in 1991.

Blue vs White

1991
 Blue: Yukong Elephant, Lucky-Goldstar Hwangso, Daewoo Royals
 White: Ilhwa Chunma, POSCO Atoms, Hyundai Horang-i

1992
 Blue: Yukong Elephant, LG Cheetahs, Ilhwa Chunma
 White: POSCO Atoms, Hyundai Horang-i, Daewoo Royals

South Koreans vs Foreigners

1995
 Blue Dragon: South Korean footballers
 White Tiger: Foreign footballers

1997
 Blue Dragon: South Korean footballers
 White Tiger: Foreign footballers

Central vs South

1998
 Central: Suwon Samsung Bluewings, Cheonan Ilhwa Chunma, Anyang LG Cheetahs, Bucheon SK, Daejeon Citizen
 South: Busan Daewoo Royals, Ulsan Hyundai Horang-i, Jeonnam Dragons, Pohang Steelers, Jeonbuk Hyundai Motors

1999
 Central: Anyang LG Cheetahs, Bucheon SK, Cheonan Ilhwa Chunma, Daejeon Citizen, Suwon Samsung Bluewings
 South: Busan Daewoo Royals, Jeonnam Dragons, Jeonbuk Hyundai Motors, Pohang Steelers, Ulsan Hyundai Horang-i

2000
 Central: Anyang LG Cheetahs, Bucheon SK, Daejeon Citizen, Seongnam Ilhwa Chunma, Suwon Samsung Bluewings
 South: Busan I’Cons, Jeonnam Dragons, Jeonbuk Hyundai Motors, Pohang Steelers, Ulsan Hyundai Horang-i

2001
 Central: Anyang LG Cheetahs, Bucheon SK, Daejeon Citizen, Seongnam Ilhwa Chunma, Suwon Samsung Bluewings
 South: Busan I’Cons, Jeonnam Dragons, Jeonbuk Hyundai Motors, Pohang Steelers, Ulsan Hyundai Horang-i

2002
 Central: Anyang LG Cheetahs, Bucheon SK, Daejeon Citizen, Seongnam Ilhwa Chunma, Suwon Samsung Bluewings
 South: Busan I’Cons, Jeonnam Dragons, Jeonbuk Hyundai Motors, Pohang Steelers, Ulsan Hyundai Horang-i

2003
 Central: Anyang LG Cheetahs, Bucheon SK, Daejeon Citizen, Seongnam Ilhwa Chunma, Suwon Samsung Bluewings
 South: Busan I'Cons, Jeonnam Dragons, Daegu FC, Gwangju Sangmu Bulsajo, Jeonbuk Hyundai Motors, Pohang Steelers, Ulsan Hyundai Horang-i

2004
 Central: Bucheon SK, Daejeon Citizen, FC Seoul, Incheon United, Seongnam Ilhwa Chunma, Suwon Samsung Bluewings
 South: Busan I'Cons, Jeonnam Dragons, Daegu FC, Gwangju Sangmu Bulsajo, Jeonbuk Hyundai Motors, Pohang Steelers, Ulsan Hyundai Horang-i

2005
 Central: Bucheon SK, Daejeon Citizen, FC Seoul, Incheon United, Seongnam Ilhwa Chunma, Suwon Samsung Bluewings
 South: Busan I'Park, Jeonnam Dragons, Daegu FC, Gwangju Sangmu Bulsajo, Jeonbuk Hyundai Motors, Pohang Steelers, Ulsan Hyundai Horang-i

2006
 Central: Daegu FC, Daejeon Citizen, FC Seoul, Incheon United, Jeonbuk Hyundai Motors, Seongnam Ilhwa Chunma, Suwon Samsung Bluewings
 South: Busan I'Park, Jeonnam Dragons, Gwangju Sangmu Bulsajo, Gyeongnam FC, Jeju United, Pohang Steelers, Ulsan Hyundai Horang-i

2007
 Central: Daegu FC, Daejeon Citizen, FC Seoul, Incheon United, Jeonbuk Hyundai Motors, Seongnam Ilhwa Chunma, Suwon Samsung Bluewings
 South: Busan I'Park, Jeonnam Dragons, Gwangju Sangmu, Gyeongnam FC, Jeju United, Pohang Steelers, Ulsan Hyundai Horang-i

vs J.League (JOMO Cup)

2008

2009

Event matches

2010

2012
This match was held to commemorate the 10th anniversary of the 2002 FIFA World Cup, which South Korea hosted and reached the semi-finals.

2013

2014

2017
Source:

2019
The friendly match against Juventus was hosted by South Korean sports agency TheFasta on 26 July 2019. The K League Federation defined that this match wasn't official All-Star Game, but they cooperated to accomplish the match. It was scheduled to kick-off at 20:00, but it was delayed for 50 minutes because Juventus players and staff arrived late at the stadium. This match caused controversy in South Korea due to Cristiano Ronaldo who disdained the contract by refusing the signing event and sitting on the bench throughout the game.

2022
E-commerce company Coupang hosted Tottenham Hotspur's two friendlies against K League All-Stars and Sevilla under the name of Coupang Play Series.

See also
 JOMO Cup
 J.League All-Star Soccer

References

External links

All-Star
All-star games
Representative teams of association football leagues